The 2021 UCI BMX World Championships was held from 20 to 22 August 2021 at Papendal in Arnhem in Netherlands.

Medal summary

Elite events

Junior events

Medal table

See also
2021 UCI Urban Cycling World Championships
2020 UCI Track Cycling World Championships – Men's keirin
2020 UCI Track Cycling World Championships – Women's keirin

References

UCI BMX World Championships
BMX Championships
BMX
UCI BMX World Championships
UCI